St. Augustine's Episcopal Church Complex is a historic Episcopal church complex at 6 Old Post Road north of Croton-on-Hudson, Westchester County, New York.  The complex consists of the church and rectory  The church consists of the original building and a later parish hall connected by an enclosed hyphen.  The church was built in 1857, the parish hall was added in 1882, and the rectory was completed in 1910.  The church and parish hall are in the Gothic Revival style, while the rectory is in the Colonial Revival style.

It was added to the National Register of Historic Places in 2006.

See also
National Register of Historic Places listings in northern Westchester County, New York

References

External links
St. Augustine's Episcopal Church website

Episcopal church buildings in New York (state)
Saint Augustine
Churches on the National Register of Historic Places in New York (state)
National Register of Historic Places in Westchester County, New York
Gothic Revival church buildings in New York (state)
Colonial Revival architecture in New York (state)